Zinfandel (also known as Primitivo) is a variety of black-skinned wine grape. The variety is grown in over 10 percent of California vineyards. DNA analysis has revealed that it is genetically equivalent to the Croatian grapes Crljenak Kaštelanski and Tribidrag, as well as to the Primitivo variety traditionally grown in Apulia (the "heel" of Italy), where it was introduced in the 18th century and Kratošija in Montenegro. The grape found its way to the United States in the mid-19th century, where it became known by variations of a name applied to a different grape, likely "Zierfandler" from Austria.

The grapes typically produce a robust red wine, although, in the United States, a semi-sweet rosé (blush-style) wine called White Zinfandel has six times the sales of the red wine. The grape's high sugar content can be fermented into levels of alcohol exceeding 15 percent.

The taste of the red wine depends on the ripeness of the grapes from which it is made. Red berry fruit flavors like raspberry predominate in wines from cooler areas, whereas blackberry, anise and pepper notes are more common in wines made in warmer areas and in wines made from the earlier-ripening Primitivo clone.

History

Europe (6000 BCE–1870) 
Archaeological evidence indicates that domestication of Vitis vinifera occurred in the Caucasus region around 6000 BCE, and winemaking was discovered shortly after that. Cultivation of the vine subsequently spread to the Mediterranean and surrounding regions. Croatia once had several indigenous varieties related to Zinfandel, which formed the basis of its wine industry in the 19th century. This diversity suggests that the grapes have been grown in Croatia longer than anywhere else. These varieties were almost entirely wiped out, however, by the phylloxera epidemic of the late 19th century, eventually reducing Zinfandel to just nine vines of locally-known "Crljenak Kaštelanski" discovered in 2001 on the Dalmatian coast of Croatia.

The first documented use of the term Primitivo appears in Italian governmental publications of the 1870s. The name derives from the terms primativus or primaticcio, which refer to the grape's tendency to ripen earlier than other varieties. This name's appearance, 40 years after the first documented use of the term Zinfandel, was previously thought to suggest that Primitivo was introduced to Italy from across the Atlantic; however, this hypothesis has become unlikely since the discovery of the vine's Croatian origin.

Primitivo is now thought to have been introduced as a distinct clone into Italy's Apulia region in the 18th century. Don Francesco Filippo Indellicati, the priest of the church at Gioia del Colle near Bari, selected an early ("primo") ripening plant of the Zagarese variety and planted it in Liponti. This clone ripened at the end of August and became widespread throughout northern Apulia. Cuttings came to the other great Primitivo DOC (denominazione di origine controllata or "denomination of controlled origin") as part of the dowry of the Countess Sabini of Altamura when she married Don Tommaso Schiavoni-Tafuri of Manduria in the late 19th century.

United States east coast (1829–1850) 
The arrival of Zinfandel in the United States may have been via the Imperial Nursery in Vienna, Austria, which probably obtained the vines during the Habsburg monarchy's control over the Dalmatian territories of the former Republic of Venice. George Gibbs, a horticulturist on Long Island, received shipments of grapes from Schönbrunn and elsewhere in Europe between 1820 and 1829. Sullivan suggests that the "Black Zinfardel of Hungary" mentioned by William Robert Prince in A Treatise on the Vine (1830) may have referred to one of Gibbs's 1829 acquisitions. Webster suggests that the name is a modification of the Hungarian tzinifándli (czirifandli), which derives from the German Zierfandler, a white grape (Grüner Sylvaner) from Austria's Thermenregion.

Gibbs visited Boston in 1830, and Samuel Perkins of that city began selling "Zenfendal" soon afterward. In 1830, Gibbs also supplied Prince with "Black St. Peters," a similar variety that may have come from England, where many vines have "St. Peters" in their names. Little is known about this vine, except that the Black St. Peters that arrived in California in the 1850s was the same as what became known as Zinfandel by the 1870s.

By 1835 Charles M. Hovey, Boston's leading nurseryman, was recommending "Zinfindal" as a table grape. It was soon widely grown in heated greenhouses to produce table grapes as early as June. The first reference to making wine from "Zinfindal" appears in John Fisk Allen's Practical Treatise in the Culture and Treatment of the Grape Vine (1847). Meanwhile, the fad of hothouse cultivation faded in the 1850s as attention turned to the Concord and other grape varieties that could be grown outdoors in Boston.

California (1850–1933) 
Prince and other nurseryman, such as Frederick W. Macondray (future son-in-law of Faxon Atherton), joined the California Gold Rush in the 1850s and took Zinfandel with them. Prince's notebook records that the grape dried "perfectly to Raisin" and that he believed his Zinfandel was the same as the "Black Sonora" he found in California. When the vine known as "Black St. Peters" arrived in California, it was initially regarded as a distinct variety, but by the 1870s, it was recognized as the same grape as Zinfandel.

Joseph W. Osborne may have made the first wine from Zinfandel in California. He planted Zinfandel from Macondray at his Oak Knoll vineyard just north of Napa, and his wine was much praised in 1857. Planting of Zinfandel boomed soon after, and by the end of the 19th century, it was the most widespread variety in California.

These Zinfandel old vines are now treasured for the production of premium red wine, but many were ripped up in the 1920s, during the Prohibition years (1920–1933), but not for the obvious reason. Even during the Prohibition, home winemaking remained effectively legal, and some vineyards embraced the sale of grapes for making wine at home. While Zinfandel grapes proved popular among home winemakers living near the vineyards, it was vulnerable to rot on the long journey to East Coast markets. The thick-skinned Alicante Bouschet was less susceptible to rot, so this and similar varieties were widely planted for the home winemaking market. In 1931, 3000 cars – about  – of Zinfandel grapes were shipped, compared to 6000 cars of Alicante Bouschet.

Rediscovery after Prohibition (1933–present)
By 1930, the wine industry had weakened due to the Great Depression and Prohibition. Many vineyards that survived by supplying the home market were located in California's Central Valley, a non-optimal environment for growing quality Zinfandel. Thus, the end of Prohibition left a shortage of quality wine grapes, and Zinfandel sank into obscurity as most was blended into undistinguished fortified wines. However, some producers remained interested in making single varietal red wines.

By the middle of the 20th century, the origins of California Zinfandel had been forgotten. In 1972, one British wine writer wrote, "there is a fascinating Californian grape, the zinfandel, said to have come from Hungary, but apparently, a cépage now unknown there."  In 1974 and 1981, American wine writers described it as "a California original, grown nowhere else" and "California's own red grape".

In 1972, Bob Trinchero of the Sutter Home Winery decided to try draining some juice from the vats to impart more tannins and color to his Deaver Vineyard Zinfandel. He vinified this juice as a dry wine, and tried to sell it under the name of Oeil de Perdrix, a Swiss wine made by this saignée method. The Bureau of Alcohol, Tobacco and Firearms insisted on an English translation, so he added "White Zinfandel" to the name, and sold 220 cases. At the time, demand for white wine exceeded the availability of white wine grapes, encouraging other California producers to make "white" wine from red grapes, with minimal skin contact.  However, in 1975, Trinchero's wine experienced a stuck fermentation, a problem in which the yeast dies off before all the sugar is converted to alcohol. He put the wine aside for two weeks, tasted it, and decided to sell this pinker, sugary wine. Just as Mateus Rosé had become a huge success in Europe after World War II, this medium sweet White Zinfandel became immensely popular. White Zinfandel still accounts for 9.9% of U.S. wine sales by volume (6.3% by value), six times the sales of red Zinfandel. Most white Zinfandel is made from grapes grown for that purpose in California's Central Valley.

Wine critics considered white Zinfandel to be insipid and uninteresting in the 1970s and 1980s, although modern white Zinfandels have more fruit and less cloying sweetness. Nevertheless, the success of this blush wine saved many old vines in premium areas, which came into their own at the end of the 20th century as red Zinfandel wines came back into fashion. Although the two wines taste dramatically different, both are made from the same (red) grapes and processed differently.

Relationship to Primitivo, Crljenak Kaštelanski and Tribidrag 

Zinfandel was long considered "America's vine and wine,"  but when University of California, Davis (UCD) professor Austin Goheen visited Italy in 1967, he noticed how the wine made from Primitivo reminded him of Zinfandel. Others also made the connection about that time. Primitivo was brought to California in 1968, and ampelographers declared it identical to Zinfandel in 1972. The first wine made from these California vines in 1975 also seemed identical to Zinfandel. In 1975, Ph.D. student Wade Wolfe showed that the two varieties had identical isozyme fingerprints.

Dr. Lamberti of Bari had suggested to Goheen in 1976 that Primitivo might be the Croatian variety Plavac Mali. By 1982, Goheen had confirmed that they were similar but not identical, probably by isozyme analysis. Some Croatians, however, became convinced that Plavac Mali was the same as Zinfandel, among them Croatian-born winemaker Mike Grgich. In 1991 Grgich and other producers came together as the Zinfandel Advocates and Producers (ZAP) with the objectives of promoting the varietal and wine and supporting scientific research on Zinfandel. With this support, UCD professor Carole Meredith went to Croatia and collected over 150 samples of Plavac Mali throughout Dalmatia, in collaboration with the University of Zagreb.

In 1993, Meredith used a DNA fingerprinting technique to confirm that Primitivo and Zinfandel were clones of the same variety. Comparative field trials have found that "Primitivo selections were generally superior to those of Zinfandel, having earlier fruit maturity, similar or higher yield, and similar or lower bunch rot susceptibility." This is consistent with the theory that Primitivo was selected as an early-ripening clone of a Croatian grape.

By 1998, Meredith's team realized that Plavac Mali was not Zinfandel, but that one was the parent of the other. In 2000 they discovered that Primitivo/Zinfandel was one parent of Plavac Mali. The other parent of Plavac Mali was determined by Ivan Pejić and Edi Maletić (University of Zagreb) to be Dobričić, an ancient variety from the Adriatic island of Šolta.

This discovery narrowed down the search to the central Dalmatian coastal strip and its offshore islands. Eventually, a matching DNA fingerprint was found among the samples. The match came from a vine sampled in 2001 in the vineyard of Ivica Radunić in Kaštel Novi. This Crljenak Kaštelanski ("Kaštela Red") appears to represent Primitivo/Zinfandel in its original home, although some genetic divergence may have occurred since their separation. Meredith now refers to the variety as "ZPC" – Zinfandel / Primitivo / Crljenak Kaštelanski.

This Croatian vineyard contained nine Crljenak Kaštelanski vines mixed with thousands of other vines. In 2002, additional vines, known locally as Pribidrag, were found in the Dalmatian coastal town of Omiš. Both clones are being propagated in California under the aegis of Ridge Vineyards, although virus infections have delayed their release. The first Croatian ZPC wine was made by Edi Maletić in 2005. Meanwhile, plantings of Primitivo have increased in California, where it seems to grow somewhat less vigorously than its sibling. Its wines are reputed to have more blackberry and spice flavors.

The 2012 book Wine Grapes Masters of wine Jancis Robinson and Julia Harding and Swiss grape geneticist Dr. José Vouillamoz detail the search for Zinfandel's origins. After years of research and DNA testing of vines from vineyards across the globe, a single 90-year-old grapevine from the garden of an elderly lady in Split, Croatia provided the evidence to show that Zinfandel was a Croatian grape that had been known as Tribidrag since at least the 15th century.

Legal issues
Local wine-labeling regulations are slowly catching up with the DNA evidence, a process that trade disputes have slowed. The European Union recognized Zinfandel as a synonym for Primitivo in January 1999, meaning that Italian Primitivos can be labeled as Zinfandel in the United States and any other country that recognizes EU labeling laws. Italian winemakers have taken advantage of these rules and shipped Primitivo wines to the United States labeled as Zinfandels, with the approval of the Alcohol and Tobacco Tax and Trade Bureau (TTB).

As of December 2007, the TTB lists both Zinfandel and Primitivo as approved grape varieties for American wines, but they are not listed as synonyms; U.S. producers, therefore, must label a wine according to whether it is Zinfandel or Primitivo. The Bureau of Alcohol, Tobacco, Firearms and Explosives (ATF) proposed in 2002 that they be recognized as synonyms. In July 2008, the proposed regulation (RIN 1513–AA32, formerly RIN 1512-AC65) was withdrawn.

Distribution and wines

United States 

Zinfandel is grown across the continental United States, although California grows the largest proportion. U.S. producers make wine in styles that range from late harvest dessert wines, rosés (White Zinfandel) and Beaujolais-style light reds to big hearty reds and fortified wine in the style of port. The quality and character of American Zinfandel wines largely depend on the climate, location, and age of the vineyard in which they are grown, as well as the technology employed by the winemaker.

Historically, California Zinfandel vines were planted as a field blend interspersed with Durif (Petite Sirah), Carignan, Grenache, Mourvèdre, Mission and Muscat. While most vineyards are now fully segregated, California winemakers continue to use other grapes (particularly Petite Sirah) in their Zinfandel wines. Zinfandel is grown on approximately 11% of California's vineyard land area. Around 400,000 short tons (350,000 tonnes) are crushed each year, depending on the harvest, placing Zinfandel third behind Chardonnay and Cabernet Sauvignon and just ahead of Merlot.

California regions

As of 2019, there were 39,500 acres planted in Zinfandel in California. Of the state's 44 Zinfandel-growing counties, the top 10 hold some 85% of the Zinfandel growing area. 
However, major producing areas such as San Joaquin County, Stanislaus County, and Madera County produce Zinfandel primarily for blends or jug wine.

Certain California regions are regarded as "exceptional" for Zinfandel, each with identifiable flavor characteristics:
 Amador has a reputation for big, full-bodied Zinfandel. These extra-ripe wines have been called jammy, briary, and brambly, having aromas of sweet berries.
 Although the Santa Cruz Mountains AVA in Santa Clara Valley produces Zinfandel from just , the Zinfandel from that region is known for its complexity and depth.
 Sonoma county has a Zinfandel-producing land area second only to that of San Joaquin County. The county contains the warm Dry Creek Valley AVA, known for its juicy Zinfandel with bright fruit, balanced acidity and notes of blackberry, anise, and pepper. Dry Creek Valley produces Zinfandel in a variety of styles ranging from the high-alcohol Amador style to balanced, spicy wines.
 San Luis Obispo, particularly the Paso Robles AVA with its hot days and cool maritime evenings, produces Zinfandel known for being soft and round.
 While the Napa Valley AVA is known primarily for its Cabernet Sauvignon, Merlot, and Syrah, Napa also produces Zinfandel wines described as plummy and intense, tasting of red berry fruits with cedar and vanilla. Zinfandel in Napa tends to be made in a claret style like red Bordeaux.
 The Russian River Valley generally produces well during warm vintages. Otherwise, the grapes do not fully ripen, leaving the wines with excessive acidity. The area has mostly "old vine" Zinfandel, characterized as spicy and somewhat lower in alcohol than Zinfandel from other regions.
 Mendocino County Zinfandel wines have been considered high quality, but they are less known because they are not heavily marketed.
 Lodi has some of the oldest Zinfandel vines in California. While often used for White Zinfandel production in the red style, Lodi Zinfandels have a reputation for being juicy and approachable.

Italy 
Most Primitivo is grown in Apulia, a coastal region known as the "heel" of Italy, and it is estimated to be the country's 12th most widely planted grape variety. The main three DOC areas are Primitivo di Manduria, Gioia del Colle Primitivo (Riserva) and Falerno del Massico Primitivo (Riserva o Vecchio). The Manduria DOC covers still red wine as well as sweet (Dolce Naturale) and fortified (Liquoroso Dolce Naturale, Liquoroso Secco) wine. Falerno requires a minimum of 85% Primitivo; the others are 100% Primitivo. Gioia del Colle Rosso and Rosato contain 50–60% Primitivo, and Cilento Rosso/Rosato contains around 15%.

Historically, the grape was fermented and shipped north to Tuscany and Piedmont, where it was used as a blending grape to enhance the body of thin red wines produced in those areas. When the link between Primitivo and Zinfandel began to emerge, plantings in the region and production of non-blended varietals increased. Today, most Italian Primitivo is made as a rustic, highly alcoholic red wine with up to 16% alcohol by volume (ABV). Some Italian winemakers age the wines in new American oak to imitate American-style Zinfandel.

Other locations

The Croatian form Crljenak Kaštelanski was not bottled in Croatia as a varietal in its own right before the link to Zinfandel was revealed. UCD has since sent clones of both Zinfandel and Primitivo to Professor Maletić in Croatia, which he planted on the island of Hvar. He made his first ZPC wines in Croatia in 2005. There is high demand for red grapes in the country, and the government has supported ongoing research. Figures from the department of viticulture and enology at the University of Zagreb claim that from only 22 vines of Crljenak Kaštelanski in Croatia in 2001, there were about 2,000 vines in 2008.

Old vine Zinfandel plantings dating from the 1930s have been found in Baja California, Mexico. There are also small Zinfandel plantings in Western Australia, Mudgee in New South Wales  and the McLaren Vale area of South Australia. South Africa has a small production of Zinfandel, including one estate rated among the country's Zinfandel producers and winner of an international prize.  In France, there is a single hectare of Zinfandel grown in the Côtes de Thongue region, sold by Domaine de l'Arjolle.

Viticulture and winemaking 

Zinfandel vines are quite vigorous and grow best in warm but not too hot climates because grapes may shrivel in hot weather. Zinfandel's thin-skinned grapes grow in large, tight bunches that are sometimes prone to bunch rot. The fruit ripens reasonably early and produces juice with high sugar content. If weather conditions permit, the grapes may be late-harvested to make dessert wine. Zinfandel is often praised for its ability to reflect both its terroir and its winemaker's style and skill.

The grapes exhibit an uneven pattern of ripening: a single bunch may contain both raisin-like, over-ripe grapes, and green, unripened grapes. Some winemakers choose to vinify the bunches with these varying levels of ripeness, while others hand-harvest the bunches, even by single berries, in multiple passes through the vineyards over several weeks. This extensively laborious practice is one component of the high cost of some Zinfandels.

Red Zinfandel wines have been criticized for being too "hot" (too alcoholic), although modern winemaking techniques have helped make them more approachable. On the other hand, Zinfandel producers such as Joel Peterson of Ravenswood believe that alcohol-removing technologies, such as reverse osmosis and spinning cones, remove a sense of terroir from the wine. If a wine has the tannins and other components to balance 15% alcohol, Peterson argues, it should be accepted on its terms.

Factors that affect the wine's flavors include the length of fermentation, length of the maceration period with skin contact, the level of oak aging, and the degrees Brix of the harvested grapes. White Zinfandel is normally harvested early at 20°Bx when the grapes have yet to develop much varietal character, though some examples can develop hints of tobacco and apple skin. At 23°Bx (the degree that most red wine is considered "ripe"), strawberry flavors develop. Cherry flavors appear at 24°Bx followed by blackberry notes at 25°Bx.

Synonyms 
Crljenak Kaštelanski, Gioia Del Colle, Locale, Morellone, Plavac Veliki, Primaticcio, Primativo, Primitivo, Primitivo Di Gioia, Primitivo Nero, Uva Della Pergola, Uva Di Corato, Zin (informal), ZPC, Black St. Peters, Zenfendal, Zinfardel, Zinfindal, Taranto, Zeinfandall, Zinfardell, Zinfindel, Zinfandal.

See also 

 Paul Draper – chief winemaker at Ridge Vineyards, pioneer of California Zinfandel
 Mike Grgich – winemaker advocate of Zinfandel who funded genetic research
 Plavac Mali – a grape variety descended from parents Zinfandel and Dobričić
 Susumaniello – Pugliese grape that also probably came from Dalmatia
 Croatian wine

References

Further reading

External links 
 Zinfandel Advocates & Producers (ZAP)

Grape varieties of Croatia
Wine grapes of Italy
Wine grapes of Apulia
Red wine grape varieties
American wine
Croatian wine